The following are the African records in Olympic weightlifting. Records are maintained in each weight class for the snatch lift, clean and jerk lift, and the total for both lifts by the Weightlifting Federation of Africa (WFA).

Current records
Key to tables:

Men

Women

Historical records

Men (1998–2018)

Women (1998–2018)

References
General
 African Weightlifting Records – Men 
 African Weightlifting Records – Women 
Specific

External links
 WFA official website

 
Weightlifting in Africa
African
Weightlifting